Dibbā Al-Bayʿah is geographically part of the Dibba region that faces the Arabian Sea, and is bordered by the United Arab Emirates to the south. It is a Wilayat in the Muhafazah of Musandam, Sultanate of Oman, on the east coast of the Arabian Peninsula.

See also 
 Dibba Airport
 Bukha
 Madha
 Khasab

References

External links 

Districts of Oman
Musandam Governorate
Populated places in Oman